Clanculus margaritarius, common name the beautiful clanculus, is a species of sea snail, a marine gastropod mollusk in the family Trochidae, the top snails.

Clanculus margaritarius multipunctatus Jansen, 1995: synonym of Clanculus multipunctatus Jansen, 1995

Description

Shell Characteristics 
The size of the shell varies between 9 mm and 20 mm. The very solid shell has an elate-conic shape. It is narrowly false-umbilicate, red or reddish brown, dotted with black; rosy at the apex. The outlines of the spire are a little concave toward the apex. The spire contains about 7 whorls. These are nearly flat above, with linear, impressed sutures. The body whorldescends anteriorly and is encircled by about 13 or 14 granose lirae every second one, or on some specimens every one articulated with black dots. The interstices are finely spirally and obliquely striate. The base of the shell is convex. The aperture is tetragonal. The outer lip bears within a strong tubercle above, and a few plicae on the outer and lower part. The short columella is oblique, with a very slight fold above, very deeply entering the profound, extremely narrow axial pit, and at the base terminating in a large squarish trifid tooth. The parietal tract is finely wrinkled. The umbilicus is bounded by a plicate rib.

Coloring 
The phylum Mollusca is a highly diverse and rich species, with an abundant amount of color variations that is beneficial to learn from. From this family of Mollusca, studies are done to try to have a better understanding of pigmentation evolution, which can answer some bigger questions about color evolutions in the natural world.

Coloring in shells can result from a multitude of factors, such as behavioral characteristics and the environment mollusks live in. Coloring in their shells can be associated with mating displays, diet, heritable traits and defense mechanisms. The coloring in Clanculus margaritarius is normally reddish brown, pinkish-red and yellowish-brown with black spots. Scientist have an advantage when using the phylum Mollusca to study color variations, they are able to use the visible coloring to search for genes that are involved in color synthesis.

Distribution
This marine species has a wide distribution. It occurs in the Central and East Indian Ocean, China, East India, Indo-China, Indo-Malaysia, Japan, Loyalty Islands, Malaysia, New Caledonia, New Zealand, Oceania, Papua New Guinea, Solomon Islands, Taiwan and Queensland, and Australia.

References

 Philippi, R.A. 1846. Diagnoses testaceorum quorundam novarum. Malakozoologische Blätter 1846: 97–106
 Adams, A. 1853. Contributions towards a monograph of the Trochidae, a family of gastropodous Mollusca. Proceedings of the Zoological Society of London 1851(19): 150–192
 Melvill, J.C. & Standen, R. 1899. Report on the marine Mollusca obtained during the first expedition of Prof. A.C. Haddon to the Torres Straits in 1888–89. Journal of the Linnean Society of London, Zoology 27: 150–206, pls 1–2
 Melvill, J.C. & Sykes, E.R. 1899. Notes on a third collection of marine shells from the Andaman Islands, with descriptions of three new species of Mitra. Proceedings of the Malacological Society of London 3(4): 220–229
 Schepman, M.M. 1908. Prosobranchia (excluding Heteropoda and parasitic Prosobranchia). Rhipidoglossa and Docoglossa. With an appendix by Prof. R. Bergh [Pectinobranchiata]. Siboga-Expéditie Report 49(1): 1–108, 9 pls 
 Fischer, P.J. 1927. Beitrag zur Kenntnis der Pliozän- fauna der Mollusken-Inseln Seran und Obi. 1–179, pls. 212–217 in Wanner, J. (ed.). Paläontologie von Timor. Vol. 15.
 Allan, J.K. 1950. Australian Shells: with related animals living in the sea, in freshwater and on the land. Melbourne : Georgian House xix, 470 pp., 45 pls, 112 text figs
 Cernohorsky, W.O. 1972. Marine Shells of the Pacific. Sydney : Pacific Publications Vol. 2 411 pp., 68 pls.
 Wilson, B. 1993. Australian Marine Shells. Prosobranch Gastropods. Kallaroo, Western Australia : Odyssey Publishing Vol. 1 408 pp.
 Jansen, P. 1995. A review of the genus Clanculus Montfort, 1810 (Gastropoda: Trochidae) in Australia, with description of a new subspecies and the introduction of a nomen novum. Vita Marina 43(1–2): 39–62
 Poppe G.T., Tagaro S.P. & Dekker H. (2006) The Seguenziidae, Chilodontidae, Trochidae, Calliostomatidae and Solariellidae of the Philippine Islands. Visaya Supplement 2: 1–228. page(s): 71

External links
 

margaritarius
Gastropods described in 1849
Taxa named by Rodolfo Amando Philippi